Georg Martin Adolf von Henselt (9 or 12 May 181410 October 1889) was a German composer and virtuoso pianist.

Life
Henselt was born at Schwabach, in Bavaria. At the age of three he began to learn the violin, and at five the piano under Josephe von Flad (1778-1843), who had trained in composition with Franz Danzi, Abbé (George Joseph) Vogler, Joseph Graetz and studied piano with Franz Lauska (who later coached Meyerbeer, Felix and Fanny Mendelssohn). His concert debut was at the Odeon in Munich, where he played the opening Allegro to one of Mozart's C major concertos, a free fantasy with variations on a theme from Weber's Der Freischütz, and a rondo by Kalkbrenner. It was through Flad's influence with King Ludwig I of Bavaria that Henselt was provided the financial means to undertake further study with Johann Nepomuk Hummel (1778-1837) in Weimar in 1832 for some months. Later that year, he went to Vienna, where, besides studying composition under Simon Sechter (the later teacher of Anton Bruckner), he was successful as a concert pianist.

In 1836, to improve his health, he made a prolonged tour through the chief German towns. In 1837, he settled at Breslau, where he had married Rosalie Vogel—but the following year migrated to Saint Petersburg, where previous visits made him welcome. He became court pianist and inspector of musical studies in the Imperial Institute of Female Education, and was ennobled in 1876. Henselt usually spent summer holidays in Germany. In 1852, and again in 1867, he visited England, though in the latter year he made no public appearance. Saint Petersburg was his home nearly until his death from cardiac disease during a stay at Warmbrunn, Germany (now in Poland).

To some ears, Henselt's playing combined Franz Liszt's sonority with Hummel's smoothness. It was full of poetry, remarkable for his use of extended chords and technique. His cantabile playing was highly regarded. "Find out the secret of Henselt's hands," Liszt told his pupils. Once he commented on the lengths Henselt took to achieve his famous legato, saying, "I could have had velvet paws like that if I had wanted to." Henselt's influence on the next generation of Russian pianists was immense. Henselt's playing and teaching greatly influenced the Russian school of music, developing from seeds planted by John Field. Sergei Rachmaninoff held him in very great esteem, and considered him one of his most important influences.

He excelled in his own works and in those of Carl Maria von Weber and Frédéric Chopin. His Piano Concerto in F minor, Op. 16 was once frequently played in Europe, and of his many valuable studies, the Étude in F-sharp major Si oiseau j'étais, was very popular. At one time Henselt was second to Anton Rubinstein in the direction of the Saint Petersburg Conservatory.

However, despite his relatively long life, Henselt ceased nearly all composition by the age of thirty. The reasons are unclear. Chronic stage fright, bordering on paranoia, caused him to withdraw from concert appearances by age thirty-three.

Works

Piano solo
(selective list)
Variations on ‘Io son' ricco’ from Donizetti's L'elisir d'amore, Op. 1 (1830)
Rondo Serioso in D minor, Op. 1b
Douze Études caractéristiques, Op. 2 (1837–1838)
 in D minor, "Orage, tu ne saurais abbattre"
 in D-flat major, "Pensez un peu à moi"
 in B minor, "Exauce mes voeux"
 in B-flat major, "Repos d'amour"
 in C-sharp minor, "Vie orageuse"
 in F-sharp major, "Si oiseau j'etais"
 in D Major, "C'est la jeunesse..."
 in E minor, "Tu m'attires, m'entraines"
 in F Major, "Jeunesse d'amour, plaisir céleste"
 in E minor, "Comme le ruisseau dans la mer repand"
 in E-flat major, "Dors tu ma vie"
 in B-flat minor, "Plein de soupirs, de souvenirs"
Poème d'amour, Op. 3 (1838)
Rhapsodie in F minor, Op. 4 (1838). Originally published as "Erinnerung und Freundschaft" Op. 4, No. 1. See Op. 51.
Douze Études de salon, Op. 5 (1838)
 in E-flat major, "Eroica"
 in G major
 in A minor, "Hexentanz"
 in E major, "Ave Maria"
 in F-sharp minor, "Verlorene Heimath"
 in A-flat major, "Danklied nach Sturm"
 in C major, "Elfenreigen"
 in G minor, "Romanze mit Chor-Refrain"
 in A major
 in F minor, "Entschwundenes Glück"
 in B major, "Liebeslied"
 in G-sharp minor, "Nächtlicher Geisterzug"
Deux Nocturnes, Op. 6 
 in G-flat major, "Schmerz im Glück" (1839)
 in F major, "La Fontaine" (1839)
Impromptu in C minor, Op. 7 (1838)
Pensée fugitive in F minor, Op. 8 (1839)
Scherzo in B minor, Op. 9 (1839)
Romance in B-flat minor, Op. 10 (1840)
Variations on a Theme by Meyerbeer, Op. 11 (1840)
 Introduction
 Variation I
 Variation II
 Variation III
 Variation IV
 Variation V
 Finale
Concert Etudes, Op. 13 
, "Air russe de Noroff" (1840–1841)
 in G-flat major, "La Gondola" (1841)
 "Cavatine de Glinka"
 "Barcarolle de Glinka"
 in D-flat major, "Air de Balfe" (1846)
, "Mazurka et polka" (1846)
 "Rakoczy-Marche" (1843)
 "Marche, dédiée à S.M. l'Empereur Nicholas I"
 "Polka" (1850)
 "Romance russe de S. Tanéef"
Frühlingslied, Op. 15 (1843)
Fantaisie sur un air bohemien-russe, Op. 16 (1843)
Impromptu No. 1, WoO
Impromptu No. 2, Op. 17 (1843)
Vier Romanzen, Op. 18 
 in E-flat major (1847–1848)
 in B-flat minor, "Der Dombau" (1848)
 in B-flat major (1843?)
 in C-sharp minor (1843?)
Arrangements of 12 numbers from Weber's operas Der Freischütz, Euryanthe and Oberon, Op. 19
"Pressentiment" for piano, Romance Michel Wielhorsky, Op. 20 (1850)
Deux Romances russes de Soumarokoff, Op. 22 (1850)
 in D minor
 in A major
Marche funèbre in G minor, Op. 23 (1850)
Toccatina in E-flat major, Op. 25 (1850)
"Das ferne Land", Romanze für Solo-Klavier, Op. 26b (1843)
Nocturne in A-flat major, Op. 27. Transcription of Romance de R. Thal (1843)
Deux petites valses, Op. 28 
 in F major (1854)
 in C major (1854)
Sophie-polka, Op. 29
Cadenza for Beethoven's Piano Concerto No. 3 in C Minor (Op. 37), Op. 29b (1854)
Grande valse – L'aurore boréale, Op. 30 (1854)
Ballade in B-flat major, Op. 31 (original version 1854, second version 1854, third revision 1879?)
Nocturne in A-flat major, Op. 32 (1854)
Chant sans paroles in B minor, Op. 33 (1850?)
Romance russe, transcription of song by Dargomyzhsky, Op. 33b (sometimes referred to as Romance No. 6) (1856)
Impromptu No. 3 in B-flat minor, Op. 34 (1854–1855)
Marche du couronnement d'Alexandre II, Op. 35. In G major (1855)
Valse mélancolique in D minor, Op. 36 (1857?)
Impromptu No. 4 in B minor, Op. 37 (1859)
Morgenständchen in D-flat major, Op. 39 (1866–1867)
Deux Romances russes, Op. 40a
 No. 1, Compte Koucheleff-Besborodko. See Op. 49.
 No. 2, Prince Kotschoubey
Duo pour le chant, Op. 40b
 No. 2, "Der Abendstern" (1868–1869)
Etude de J.B. Cramer, Op. 41
Air bohémien, Op. 42
"Mi manca la voce", Op. 43
Five transcriptions of overtures (Beethoven and Weber), Op. 44
 Transcription of Beethoven's Coriolan Overture (Op. 62)
 Transcription of Beethoven's Egmont Overture (Op. 84)
 Transcription of Romance by O.K. Klemm
 Transcription of a Waltz by Johann Strauss
 Transcription of Weber's Invitation to the Dance
 Transcription of Weber's Overture to Euryanthe
 Transcription of Weber's Overture to Oberon
 Transcription of Weber's Polacca (Op. 72)
Wiegenlied in G-flat major, Op. 45 (1840)
Invitation à la danse de C.M. Weber, Op. 47
Polacca brillante de C.M. Weber, Op. 48
Romance du Compte G. Koucheleff-Besborodko, Op. 49. See Op. 40a.
Duo pour le chant, transcrit pour le piano, Op. 50
Souvenir de Varsovie, A-flat major, Op. 51 (1838). Originally published as Op. 4 No. 2.
"Bozhe, Tsarya khrani", WoO. Transcription of the Russian national hymn.
Canon pour piano à quatre mains, WoO
Chant du printemps, WoO (1833)
Etude in A minor, WoO (1876)
Fantasiestück in C minor, manuscript
"Feuillet d'Album", WoO (about 1870)
Hymn für Prinz Pyotr Oldenburg (1882)
"L'Innocence", WoO
Meister-Studien für Klavier (published in 1892)
Mon Chant du cynge, WoO (published in 1885)
Morgenlied von Uhland, WoO (1876)
Petite Romance in B-flat minor, WoO
Petite Pièce, WoO
Petite Valse in F major, WoO
Poème d'amour - Andante et Allegro concertante, WoO, in B major
Polka brilliante in D minor, WoO
Polka favorite, WoO
Preambules in all the keys, WoO (published in 1884)
Preparatory exercises, WoO (published in 1894)
 Set 1 (1854–1855)
 Set 2 (1881)
Romance in C minor, WoO (1838)
Deux romances du Compte Michel Wielhorsky, WoO (1840)
Romance in D-flat major, WoO
Rondoletto, WoO (written 1832, published 1865)
Six Themes avec Variations de N. Paganini, WoO (1830)
Vasa-marche, WoO

Orchestral
Variations on Quand je quittai la Normandie from Meyerbeer's Robert le diable, Op. 11 (1840)
Piano Concerto in F minor, Op. 16 (1847)

Chamber
Duo, Op. 14, for cello and piano (1842)
Piano Trio in A minor, Op. 24 (1851)

Vocal
"Der Dumbau" für vierstimmigen Acappella-Chor (1840)
"Das ferne Land", Romanze für Singstimme und Klavier (1843)
"Die Nacht im Walde", song, Op. 52
Five Lieder
 "Morgenlied"
 "Pakitas Klage"
 "Die Auswanderer"
 "Liebesfahrt"
 "Stumme Liebe"

Notes

References
List of works taken from the article on Henselt by Richard Beattie Davis on Grove Music Online.
 `Edition I.M.E.` Bonn, Germany 2002.   http://www.studiopunktverlag.de
 Natalia Keil-Zenzerova "Adolph von Henselt. Ein Leben für die Klavierpädagogik in Rußland." (Frankfurt 2007)   http://www.peterlang.de   In German & Russian
 Hyperion records CDA67495 “Etudes” op.2 & op.5; Piers Lane, pianist. Liner notes by Richard Beattie Davis.

External links
 Henselt Museum (German)
 Downloadable recordings of Henselt's works in MP3 format
 Piano Trio in A minor, Op. 24 Sound-bites and short bio sketch
 
 International Henselt Society – http://www.henseltsociety.org
 Richard Beattie Davis "Henselt, Adolph von" in The New Grove Dictionary of Music and Musicians, second edition, 27 volumes. London: MacMillan 2000. .

1814 births
1889 deaths
19th-century classical composers
19th-century classical pianists
19th-century German composers
19th-century German male musicians
German male classical composers
German classical pianists
German male pianists
German Romantic composers
German untitled nobility
Male classical pianists
People from Schwabach
People from the Kingdom of Bavaria